Bregenstedt is a village and a former municipality in the Börde district in Saxony-Anhalt, Germany. Since 1 January 2010, it is part of the municipality Erxleben.

Former municipalities in Saxony-Anhalt
Börde (district)